Juan Manuel Elizondo (born June 8, 1983) is a Mexican professional tennis player.

References

External links
 

Mexican male tennis players
Living people
1983 births
Sportspeople from León, Guanajuato